Iryna Maiseyenka (born 29 October 1997) is a Belarusian female acrobatic gymnast. With partners Alina Ivanova and Yuliya Ardziakova, Maiseyenka competed in the 2014 Acrobatic Gymnastics World Championships.

References

External links 

 

1997 births
Living people
Belarusian acrobatic gymnasts
Female acrobatic gymnasts